Chitrali may refer to:

 Chitralis, an ethnic group of Chitral in northern Pakistan
 Chitrali language, also known as Khowar, the Dardic language spoken by the Chitralis
something from, or related to, the following:
 Chitral District, a mountainous district in the Khyber-Pakhtunkhwa province of Pakistan
 Chitral, the city that is the capital of the district
 Chitral (princely state)
 Chitrali cap
 Chitrali cuisine, refers to the food and cuisine of the Chitrali people
 Chitrali sitar, is a long-necked lute played in northern area, Chitral of Pakistan
 Chitrali (magazine), a defunct weekly magazine in Bangladesh. 
 Abdul Akbar Chitrali, Pakistani politician from Chitral

See also 
 Chitral (disambiguation)
 Chitrali languages (disambiguation)
 List of Chitrali people